"Goodbye My Lover" is a song by the English singer-songwriter James Blunt, written by Blunt and British songwriter Sacha Skarbek, for Blunt's debut album, Back to Bedlam (2004). The song was produced by Tom Rothrock and Jimmy Hogarth and recorded in the home of actress Carrie Fisher. The single received a positive reception from music critics.

"Goodbye My Lover" was released as the fourth single in November 2005 and reached the top ten in the United Kingdom, where it became Blunt's second top ten single. It also reached the top ten in Sweden, Belgium, Australia and France. In the United States, "Goodbye My Lover" reached number 66 on the Billboard Hot 100 due to digital downloads, even though the single was not yet released in the US. The song was formally released in the United States on 7 November 2006.

Recording
While in Los Angeles, Blunt lodged with Carrie Fisher, whom he had met through the family of a former girlfriend. Fisher was very supportive of Blunt's aspirations, and provided the use of a bathroom in her home that featured a piano for him to record "Goodbye My Lover". Blunt later said, "Everyone sings in the shower and everyone in Los Angeles seems to have a piano in the bathroom."

Release
The single was released on three physical formats. CD1 includes an exclusive non-album recording, "Close Your Eyes", which was first written during Blunt's army days. CD2 includes a further non-album recording, "Where Is My Mind" performed live in Manchester, plus the video for "Goodbye My Lover" and behind-the-scenes "Making-Of" footage. The 7-inch vinyl includes the live version of "Where Is My Mind".

Music video
"Goodbye My Lover" featured a music video that was directed by Sam Brown and was filmed on 28 October 2005 in Los Angeles. In the video Blunt is featured sitting in a darkened room by himself, reflecting on a past relationship. In what appears to be the same room, but in daylight, a young man and woman, the former lovers, share an intimate moment. The video was shot in the former home of Randolph Scott. The young woman in the video was played by Mischa Barton. The young man in the video was played by Matt Dallas.

Chart performance
In December 2005, "Goodbye My Lover" was released in the United Kingdom. The song became Blunt's second top ten single when it peaked at number nine on the singles chart, and spent a total of 14 weeks in the top 75. Outside of the UK, the song was also successful. It reached number one in Sweden and became Blunt's second number one on the singles chart.

"Goodbye My Lover" was released in Australia in December 2005 and debuted at number eight before ascending the chart to number three, remaining inside the top ten for 16 weeks, a feat rarely reached in recent years.

Due to the favourable reception of Blunt's previous single "You're Beautiful", "Goodbye My Lover" debuted on the U.S. Billboard Hot 100 singles chart at number 100, even though it had not been released as a single in the U.S. The single appeared on the chart backed solely on the strength of digital sales after a re-run of an episode of Saturday Night Live that featured Blunt performing the song. It later re-entered the Billboard Hot 100, again due to digital downloads, as a result of Blunt's performance of the song on The Oprah Winfrey Show.

Track listings
CD1
 "Goodbye My Lover" – 4:18
 "Close Your Eyes" – 3:06

CD2
 "Goodbye My Lover" – 4:18
 "Where Is My Mind" (live in Manchester) – 4:55
 "Goodbye My Lover" (the making of the video) – 3:00
 "Goodbye My Lover" (video) – 4:19

7-inch vinyl
 "Goodbye My Lover" – 4:18
 "Where Is My Mind" (live in Manchester) – 4:55

Charts

Weekly charts

Year-end charts

Certifications

Release history

References

2004 songs
2005 singles
Atlantic Records singles
Custard Records singles
James Blunt songs
Number-one singles in Sweden
Song recordings produced by Tom Rothrock
Songs about parting
Songs written by Sacha Skarbek
Torch songs